Joseph C. Panjikaran (1888-1949) of Shertallay was a Syro-Malabar Catholic monsignor, historian, theologian, journalist, and the founder of the Dharmagiri Hospital, Kothamangalam, and the Congregation of the Medical Sisters of St. Joseph (Dharmagiri sisters).

The cause of his canonisation was initiated by the Diocese of Kothamangalam in 2010.

Life
Joseph C. Panjikaran was born on 10 September 1888 in the village of Uzhuva, in the diocese of Ernakulam as the son of Chacko Panjikaran and Mariam Kanichattu.

Panjikaran became director of the propagation of faith in the Vicariate of Ernakulam. He believed that the church had responsibility to provide medical services to the poor and the sick. He opened a hospital named Dharmagiri at Kothamangalam, Kerala in 1934 and founded the congregation of Medical Sisters of St. Joseph in 1944.

He died of a heart attack on 4 November 1949.

References

1888 births
1949 deaths
People from Alappuzha district
Syro-Malabar priests
Indian Eastern Catholics
University of Madras alumni
20th-century Indian historians
20th-century Indian archaeologists
Historians of India
Historians of the Catholic Church
20th-century Indian Roman Catholic priests
Indian newspaper editors
20th-century Indian Roman Catholic theologians
Canon law jurists
Canonical theologians
Papal chamberlains
Founders of Catholic religious communities
20th-century venerated Christians
Eastern Catholic Servants of God
Malayalam-language journalists